Gornja Mikuljana is a village in Serbia situated in the municipality of Kuršumlija, and the district of Toplica. In 2002, it had 117 inhabitants, of which 110 were Serbs (94,01%).

In 1948, the village had 284 inhabitants, in 1981 148 and, in 1991, 140.

Notes and references

See also

Connected articles 
 List of cities, towns and villages in Serbia
 List of settlements in Serbia (alphabetic)

External links
  Satellite view of Gornja Mikuljana
  Gornja Mikuljana

Populated places in Toplica District